Heads Up  is the second studio album from Australian alternative group, The Stems, released on 6 October 2007 through Shock Records. The album was recorded at Kingdom Studios, Perth, mixed at Ultrasuede Studio Inc, Cincinnati, Ohio by producer John Curley (The White Stripes, The Afghan Whigs, The Greenhornes, Ronnie Spector) and mastered at Oceanway, Los Angeles, California by Alan Yoshida.

Track listing
All tracks written by Dom Mariani, unless otherwise noted.
 "Leave You Way Behind" - 3:45
 "She Sees Everything" - 4:39
 "Surround Me" (Dave Shaw) - 4:11
 "Undying Love" - 4:16
 "What's Your Stand" (Richard Lane, Glenn Morris) - 3:37
 "Hellbound Train" - 3:47
 "Get To Know Me" - 4:20
 "Only If You Want It" (Richard Lane, Glenn Morris) - 3:54
 "Liar" (Dave Shaw) - 4:06
 "Get So Bad" - 3:57

Personnel

The Stems
 Dom Mariani - guitar, lead vocals, percussion
 Julian Matthews - bass, vocals
 Richard Lane - guitar, vocals, combo organ, harmonica
 Dave Shaw - drums, vocals, percussion

Additional musicians
 Ashley Naylor - vocals ("Undying Love", "Surround Me" & "What's Your Stand")
 Lasse Bjorn - handclaps

References

External links
 Beat Magazine (November 7, 2007)

2007 albums
The Stems albums